The Missouri Volunteer Militia (MVM)  was the state militia organization of Missouri, before the formation of the Missouri State Guard in the American Civil War.

Prior to the Civil War, Missouri had an informal state militia that could be called up by the governor for emergencies or annual drill "in accordance with the Missouri State Statutes of 1854." Larger militia elements, such as brigades or the element employed in the November 1860 Southwest Expedition of James Montgomery, were composed of independent regularly drilling volunteer companies, such as the St. Louis Grays, the National Guards, and the Washington Blues. Each of these companies wore its own distinctive, and highly ornate, uniform. Antebellum esprit de corps was enhanced by drill competitions among the independent companies.

Secession 

During the 1861 secession crisis, pro-secession Missourians sought to use the state militia to their advantage.  On 13 February 1861, General Daniel M. Frost formed five new MVM companies composed entirely of pro-secessionist "Minutemen".

On 21 March 1861, the Missouri Constitutional Convention voted against secession, killing any possibility of secession by political action.

Governor Claiborne Jackson, a crypto-secessionist, then called up part of the MVM under Frost, and posted them just outside St. Louis, with the intent of seizing the city by force. This alleged plot was thwarted on 10 May 1861 when the MVM force was surprised and captured by unofficial Unionist Saint Louis Home Guard, a paramilitary arm of the Unconditional Union Party organized by Francis Preston Blair, Jr., and led by U.S. Army officers including Nathaniel Lyon, during the so-called Camp Jackson Affair.

This shocking for secessionists act prompted the Missouri legislature to pass the "Military Bill" proposed by Governor Jackson, which gave the governor near-dictatorial control over the state militia, and reorganized it into the Missouri State Guard. On June 11, Governor Jackson met with Francis Preston Blair, Jr. and Nathaniel Lyon, who on Blair's suggestion was appointed by the U.S. War Department as Commander of the Western Department of the U.S. Army, at St. Louis' Planter's House Hotel to negotiate. A compromise was not reached and both sides afterwards blamed each other. On June 12, 1861, Governor Jackson issued a Proclamation to the State:

Failure to restore the Price–Harney Truce conditions escalated tensions, and though the state of Missouri formally stayed in the Union, it became engulfed in guerrilla warfare and went through a series of bitter battles at the end of the Civil war.

See also
 Enrolled Missouri Militia
 Home Guard (Union)
 Missouri State Guard
 Missouri State Militia (Union)
 Provisional Enrolled Missouri Militia

References

Missouri in the American Civil War